Municipal politics in Montreal's city council revolve around its elected councillors, the municipal political parties to which they belong, and the mayor.

Montreal is one of the rare examples of a city with municipal political parties in Canada (they also exist in Vancouver). Political parties were legalized in Quebec by the PQ government in power in 1978. However, they existed long before official recognition by the provincial government.

Parties represented in Council

Other registered parties

Former parties  
Action civique de Saint-Léonard
Action civique Montréal
Action Montreal
Civic Action League (1951-1961) 
Civic Party of Montreal (1960-1994) 
Coalition Démocratique–Montréal Écologique
Équipe conservons Outremont 
Équipe démocratique de Saint-Léonard
Équipe du renouveau de la cité de Saint-Léonard
Équipe Montréal
Montreal Citizens' Movement (1973-2001)
Montréal Écologique
Municipal Action Group
Nouveau Montréal
Parti de l'alliance municipale (Saint-Leonard)
Parti des Montréalais
 Parti Fierté Montréal
Parti Montréal Ville-Marie
Parti Municipal (Saint-Léonard)
Parti municipal de Montréal
Parti éléphant blanc de Montréal
Ralliement de Saint-Léonard
Rassemblement des citoyens et citoyennes de Saint-Léonard
Union municipale de Saint-Léonard
Union Montreal 
Unité de Saint-Léonard
 Vision Montreal (1994-2014)

Footnotes

 
Montreal
Parties, Montreal